Gödəkqobu (also, Gëdakkobu, Gedekkobu, and Gëdyakkobu) is a village and municipality in the Zardab Rayon of Azerbaijan.  It has a population of 1,363.

References 

Populated places in Zardab District